The Lone Shark was a weekly, 30-minute public-access television cable TV program which broadcast for ten years (1991–2001) on WFAC-TV (1991–2000) and SoundView Community Television (2000–2001). Both television stations were part of Cablevision of Southern Connecticut’s cable system, which spans the southwestern coast of Connecticut from the New York State border to the middle of New Haven County.

The Lone Shark was hosted by the program's creator and Executive Producer Jim Sharky and co-hosted by the program's Producer Sean Haffner (a.k.a. ″Sean The Producer″). Although the program was unscripted, Sharky would usually have a list of topics that he wanted to discuss with Haffner on each episode. The Lone Shark was known for its fast pace, strong language and adult themes, often pushing the limits of what station managers believed could be allowed on television.

The Lone Shark was originally recorded in-studio or on-location and edited before broadcast, but after 1993 the program was broadcast "live" without a broadcast delay, editing or censor. In August 2001 the program was permanently suspended from production by the SoundView Television station management after The Lone Shark aired three seconds of a graphic adult sex video on live television during prime time.

History

"VoxPop Television"

In early 1990, Cablevision's Public-access television studio was located at the University of Bridgeport in Bridgeport, Connecticut in an on-campus broadcast facility. Jim Sharky was appearing on ″VoxPop Television″ (a weekly program broadcast on Cablevision of Southern Connecticut's local-cable TV station, produced and hosted by Bill Arciprete and Peter Vouras). Sharky's appearances were basically as a "correspondent", in that he would pre-tape "on-location" segments that would then be shown during episodes of VoxPop Television.

"Outta Control!"

After working on VoxPop Television for a few months, Sharky decided that he had learned enough to produce and host his own television program. In the summer of 1990, Sharky began production of ″Outta Control!″. The program was basically what its name implied: a 60-minute-long eclectic mix of in-studio interviews with faux guests. Outta Controll! also included strange features such as studio crew members holding large banners with the title of the program's current segment printed on the banner (in place of on-screen computer graphics) behind Sharky and the guests.

After only six episodes, Outta Control! was suspended from production by Cablevision's station management for violations of the station's broadcast regulations. One segment of the program had featured the contact information for the business owned by a guest of the program, and the station management deemed this to be an unpaid advertisement for the guest's business. Sharky was warned to remove the contact information before the episode was re-broadcast as a rerun, but time restrictions and a lack of access to the station's video editing facilities caused Sharky to allow the episode to be re-broadcast with the guest's contact information intact later that same week. Cablevision's station management notified Sharky that, because of this second violation in such a short period of time, production of Outta Control! was permanently suspended.

WFAC-TV (Fairfield University Studios) — 1991-1995

In 1991, Cablevision moved its local-cable television studio to Xavier Hall on the campus of Fairfield University in Fairfield, Connecticut. Eventually, these new facilities were named WFAC-TV. Along with this change in the location of the production facilities came a change in station management. Because Jim Sharky's Outta Control! suspension was imposed by the former University of Bridgeport station management (which had no bearing on the new facilities), the suspension was deemed to be no longer valid and Sharky was allowed to produce a television program at the new studio facilities.

"The Lone Shark" (1991-1993)
Sharky decided to call his new program The Lone Shark. The name was a play on words, referring to Sharky's nickname of "Shark" and that he was no longer working as a correspondent for VoxPop Television, but instead was hosting his own program. The Lone Shark was to be a 30-minute-long program. Sharky had noticed that, because of his tendency to rush through segments at a breathless pace, the 60-minute-long Outta Control! usually got to a point in the second half of the program where he had used all of the pre-planned material for the program. Therefore, the last 10–15 minutes of Outta Control! would become an unscripted free-form rehash of previous segments of the program, which Sharky didn't like. By shortening The Lone Shark's length to 30 minutes, the hope was to always have enough pre-planned content to fill the entire length of the program (and possibly have some unused content left over to use for the next week's program).

Production of The Lone Shark began at the Xavier Hall production facilities in June 1991. Jim Sharky was both The Lone Shark's Executive Producer and host, with Gordon Oppenheimer working as the program's director and Lou Segal operating the audio board and VTRs in the studio's control room. Although The Lone Shark used three video cameras in-studio, all three cameras were usually unmanned and locked in pre-set positions for the duration of each program (until Haffner joined the production staff).

The Lone Shark had no production budget whatsoever, so the opening and closing credits of the program were actually made by Jim Sharky himself at home. Sharky would use a combination of a Microsoft Windows 3.11 screen saver and simple images that he created with Windows Paintbrush on his personal computer at home to create an animated graphic for the credits. Sharky would then use an S-VHS camcorder to videotape this animated graphic on his computer's monitor. This method was also used by Sharky (and later, by Haffner) to create The Lone Shark's "backdrop" which appeared behind Sharky as he hosted the program, using the chromakey (or "bluescreen") technique. Using this technique allowed for a complete change to the look of each segment of The Lone Shark, as the background could be changed to a graphic suitable to the specific subject being covered in each segment. This eliminated the need for "practical" sets in-studio, instead replacing them with "digital" sets which cost nothing more than the price of a VHS video cassette, which could then be recorded over for the next week's program.

Taped episodes (1991–1993)

In the first month of production, one of the earliest episodes of The Lone Shark featured the disembodied heads of Jim Sharky and Lou Segal as they co-hosted the program from the inside of a refrigerator filled with fake body parts (using the chromakey effect). This episode – ″The Jeffrey Dahmer Children's Show″ – prompted the first print-media attention for The Lone Shark when a Connecticut Post writer mentioned the episode in his weekly column. That same episode prompted Sean Haffner to contact Jim Sharky and offer his assistance to the production of The Lone Shark. Haffner (an acquaintance of Sharky's since they were children) was supposed to have begun working on the production staff of Outta Control! in 1990, but production of that program was permanently suspended before Haffner could join the production. He first joined The Lone Shark as an audience member (under a rubber alien mask) during the taping of the ″Leonard Nimoy Disco Dance Party″ episode. Haffner finally joined The Lone Shark’s production staff in July 1991 as a cameraman and production assistant for the on-location recording of the program's ″Blind Mini Golf″ episode at Milford Amusement in Milford, Connecticut.

The production crew of The Lone Shark then consisted of a staff of four, with each crew member performing more than one duty. Sharky produced, hosted and wrote material; Haffner was floor director and operated the in-studio cameras; Oppenheimer directed the program from the control room and managed the in-studio lighting; Segal operated the audio board and VTRs. Because of the communal environment at the Xavier Hall production facilities, producers and staff from other programs would often sit in on the tapings of each other's programs, at times becoming regular crew members of other productions. Also, because the production facilities were located in the Fairfield University Media Center, the Fairfield University Video Production Course was located directly across the hallway from the studio. The Video Production students were often brought into the studio to view the set-up and recording of The Lone Shark as a part of their education. Because of these two groups joining The Lone Shark's production staff, for a while in 1992 and 1993, the staff grew to over 20 people on a program that needed no more than four or five staff members. Many of the extra crew and students had nothing to do during the program's taping, so they were often used as a live in-studio audience.

Due to scheduling conflicts for the booking of studio time and broadcast time, The Lone Shark was often recorded within an hour of its actual broadcast, with little or no time to edit the program. Many times, the just-recorded program tapes were literally run down the hall to the broadcast facility with only minutes  or seconds until the program's on-air broadcast time. The Lone Shark was basically being broadcast as a taped-but-unedited live program.

Live episodes (1992)

In 1992, The Lone Shark broadcast two live episodes on dates when the program's studio time aligned with its broadcast time. The March 17, 1992 (St. Patrick's Day) episode featured in-studio body piercings, with a man getting his nipple pierced and a woman getting her navel pierced. The extremely close-up, full-screen camera shots of the piercings were so graphic that the station manager declared "There's no place on television for that kind of material" and attempted to suspend The Lone Shark from production, but was unsuccessful. Later in the year, the second live broadcast featured less-controversial material, as it was basically an episode dedicated to taking viewer phone calls.

Format change (1992)

A few months after Sean Haffner began working on The Lone Shark, host Jim Sharky realized that he and Haffner worked well together (even if they didn’t always have the same ideas as to the content and direction of the program). Sharky asked Haffner if he would like to be the producer of The Lone Shark (with Sharky controlling the program as Executive Producer) and Haffner accepted. From that time until the end of The Lone Shark’s production, Sharky would control the content of The Lone Shark, while Haffner controlled the technical aspects of the program.

Sharky and Haffner were usually the only people in the studio during each episode of The Lone Shark (unless the episode featured an in-studio guest). The rest of The Lone Shark’s crew was usually working in the control room, keeping in contact with Haffner in the studio through a communication headset that was plugged into either Haffner's camera or a port in the studio's wall. Haffner almost always stood directly behind the camera that was pointed at Sharky, to keep Sharky from looking away from the camera as they spoke during the program. Because The Lone Shark was unscripted and the teleprompter on Sharky's camera was not used for text to be read, Sharky asked the WFAC-TV technicians to show Haffner how to re-wire the teleprompter so that it displayed the same video feed that The Lone Shark’s viewers were watching. This was so that Sharky would be able to know exactly what could and could not be seen by the home viewers. Haffner would position an in-studio monitor on a rolling cart next to himself so that he could also see this same video feed during the program.

Jim Sharky would often talk to Sean Haffner during each episode of The Lone Shark, but because Haffner was not on microphone, many times the viewers could not hear Haffner's comments to Sharky. In 1992, Sharky decided to remedy this situation by giving Haffner a microphone and making him Sharky's co-host. Haffner (now known as ″Sean The Producer″) would stay behind the camera while co-hosting the program, which allowed him to freely wander the studio and attend to technical duties while he and Sharky carried on conversations. This became the regular format of The Lone Shark for all future episodes, with Jim Sharky sitting in front of the camera, dictating the program's topics and controlling the phones, while Haffner controlled the cameras and was heard but rarely seen by The Lone Shark’s viewers (except for humorous ″Voice Of Sean The Producer″ graphics that Sharky created to be displayed whenever Haffner spoke for any length of time).

Addition Of CGI graphics

In 1993, host Jim Sharky was contacted by a viewer named Dave Warner, who offered his services as a computer graphics designer. Warner said that he would create new opening and closing credits for The Lone Shark and that he would do the work for free. Warner had been creating CGI graphics on an Amiga computer at home, and he wanted his work to be exposed to an audience. Warner, along with his friend and co-designer Dave Parent, met Sharky and Haffner at WFAC-TV before a recording of The Lone Shark. Warner and Parent presented Sharky with a demo reel of different CGI animations they had created. Sharky and Haffner – surprised by the professional quality of the animations – immediately accepted Warner's offer. They soon learned that Warner was legally blind (due to congenital eye diseases), which made the high quality of his animations even more surprising.

Dave Warner's animations changed the look of The Lone Shark. The new opening and closing credit animations that Warner created rivaled most network television CGI animations at that time. Editing of The Lone Shark’s taped episodes moved from the editing suite at WFAC-TV to a room at Warner's house. In that room, Warner, Sharky and Haffner would convene every week to decide what graphics and animations would be edited into each episode of the program. Warner would then create the graphics and animations. A few days later, the trio would again meet at Warner's house to edit the images into the pre-recorded episodes. Often on The Lone Shark, Sharky and Haffner would make comments about images or graphics as if they were seeing them while recording the episode – when, in fact, the graphics would not even be created by Warner until after the episode was recorded.

Dave Warner worked on The Lone Shark for less than two years. In 1995, he moved back to his hometown in New York State to receive treatment for his multiple visual impairments. Although Warner was only on The Lone Shark’s staff from 1993 to 1995, his opening and closing credit animations were used on the program until its end in 2001.

List Of Notable Episodes

A list of some of the more popular or important episodes of The Lone Shark television program, with links to clips from some of the episodes.

Conflicts At WFAC-TV

″The Inner Circle″ vs. Other Producers

Most members of The Lone Shark’s crew also worked on VoxPop Television, Sports Line (with Rod Michaud) and a few other programs. This led to the hosts and crews of these programs jokingly referring to themselves on-air as ”The Inner Circle” of WFAC-TV. It was explained (again, jokingly) that the name referred to the efficiency of the programs’ crews as well as to the quality of their programs, as compared to others at the station. Although the members of ”The Inner Circle” themselves did not take the name seriously, some of the producers of other programs at WFAC-TV (who didn’t perceive the humor in the name) took it as a sign of bravado. These producers – particularly Gus Montanaro, the host of ″Bridgeport’s Open Forum″ – viewed ″The Inner Circle″ as arrogant and egotistical. Montanaro would regularly make defamatory comments about ″The Inner Circle″ on his program. At first, ”The Inner Circle” ignored Montanaro's comments, or laughed them off during their programs. But then, Montanaro decided to directly challenge one of the members of ″The Inner Circle″.

Montanaro's Bridgeport’s Open Forum was a live call-in political talk show on which Montanaro would take phone calls from viewers and discuss subjects pertaining to the Bridgeport, Connecticut metropolitan area. Montanaro's aggravation with ”The Inner Circle” finally led to an on-air outburst, when he began ranting against Rod Michaud. Michaud, who hosted a sports talk and interview program on the MSG Network and CPTV called ″Talking Sports″, also hosted a live call-in sports talk show at WFAC-TV called ″Sports Line″ and later, ″The Rod Michaud Show″ (both programs co-hosted by Lou Segal – who Michaud jokingly referred to as ″The Master Of Misinformation″). Montanaro claimed that he could create a better sports talk program than Michaud (who did it as his profession) and then continued to rant against all of ″The Inner Circle″. Montanaro then unsuccessfully attempted to take Michaud's time slot on the WFAC-TV programming schedule and replace Sports Line with his own sports talk call-in program. When Montanaro's program began broadcasting in his usual Friday evening time slot, it was an odd mix of local politics and sports, with Montanaro attempting to discuss both subjects seriously. The program was regularly derailed by prank phone callers who jammed the WFAC-TV phone lines. Finally, the members of ″The Inner Circle″ had enough of Montanaro's on-air attacks and attempts to force Michaud's program from its long-standing Thursday evening time slot. Many members of both the Talking Sports and The Lone Shark cast and crew began verbally attacking Gus Montanaro during the broadcasts of their programs (Bill Arciprete and Peter Vouras kept out of the fray on VoxPop). The conflict then escalated even more when Montanaro began calling Talking Sports to argue with Rod Michaud on the air.

During this period of conflict between producers at WFAC-TV, Rachel Olschan joined Gus Montanaro's crew as a production assistant. Olschan knew nothing of the conflict, joining Montanaro's crew only to get the working experience of being on the production crew of a local television program. Olschan worked as a crewmember on Montanaro's programs for a few weeks, when one evening she arrived at the WFAC-TV studio over an hour early to work on another program. When Olschan entered the studio, the Sports Line crew was setting up the studio for an imminent live broadcast, so Olschan offered to assist with the production. Host Rod Michaud and his crew regularly referred to their group as ″The He-Man Woman Haters Club″ – a reference to the all-male group in the ″Our Gang″ short films. During that evening's broadcast, Michaud noticed Rachel Olschan in the control room and asked her to come into the studio. Michaud had Olschan sit in the program's “guest seats” – two or three seats in the studio that were positioned near Michaud in such a way that they allowed him to speak casually with whoever sat in the seats. Anyone who sat in the “guest seats” was on–camera and on-microphone. As Michaud talked with Olschan, he began referring to her as ″Darla″, because the original ″Darla″ in ″Our Gang″ was the only female allowed in ″The He-Man Woman Haters Club″.  As she returned to the control room for the rest of the program, Michaud asked Olschan if she was going to continue to work as a crewmember on Sports Line and she said that she would.

The next evening, Olschan returned to WFAC-TV to work on Gus Montanaro's program. As she entered the studio, Olschan was confronted by an irate Montanaro, who had seen her appearance on Sports Line. Montanaro began berating Olschan for appearing on the program. Olschan (still knowing nothing about the conflict between ”The Inner Circle” and Montanaro) asked Gus why he was so upset with her. Montanaro shouted at Olschan: ”There are two camps at this station – there’s my camp and there’s Rod’s camp, and you can’t be in both!”. To which Olschan, shocked by Montanaro's rant, replied: ”Then I’m in Rod’s camp” – and left the studio.

The next week when Olschan showed up to work on Sports Line, she explained to Rod Michaud and the rest of the crew what had transpired between herself and Montanaro. Michaud told Rachel that she was welcome to continue working on the crew of Sports Line. From that time forward, Michaud regularly had Olschan (whom everyone now called ”Darla” during the program) in the Sports Line guest seats.

Rachel Olschan proved herself a good addition to ″The Inner Circle″, both as a crew member and in her appearances on the programs. The inclusion of Olschan on Sports Line was one of the factors that led to Rod Michaud changing the name of the program to ″The Rod Michaud Show″, because the conversations on the program often drifted away from sports. Subjects which were regularly discussed on the program included motion pictures that Olschan and Sean Haffner (who sometimes also appeared as a guest) had recently gone to see together. Olschan would later appear as ″Darla The Round Card Girl″ in the ″Fight Of The Century″ episode of The Lone Shark and as ″Darla The Prize Girl″ on episodes of Alternavision with Bill Arciprete and Sean Haffner. Years later, Olschan would go on to become a television and motion picture Producer and a partner in Dean Devlin’s Electric Entertainment.

The conflict with Gus Montanaro eventually began to fade over time, with an unspoken understanding that Montanaro was not welcome on any of ″The Inner Circle’s″ programs, and they were not welcome on ″The Montanaro Camp’s″ programs. Even so, the Montanaro conflict would arise again during the ″Fight Of The Century″ episode of The Lone Shark when Montanaro imposed on the production and involved himself in the episode, to the surprise and anger of both Jim Sharky and Sean Haffner.

"Lone Shark Live" — 1993-2001

In 1993, production of The Lone Shark began having trouble with the WFAC-TV station management when a new station rule required that the tapes of all programs that were to be broadcast from the WFAC-TV facilities had to be submitted by station management for review two weeks prior to each programs' broadcast date. This rule was one of many enacted by station management during The Lone Shark's ten years on television to try to control the content of some shows which they believed were pushing the limits of what the station management considered to be "good taste". Jim Sharky and Sean Haffner saw this two-week gap as a major hindrance to The Lone Shark. Because a majority of the topics discussed on The Lone Shark had to do with that day's or that week's news, the topics would lose meaning or topicality if they were not viewed within a few days of the program's taping.

To get around this two-week gap between taping the program and broadcasting it, the Producers decided to broadcast the program live. This move again allowed The Lone Shark to take live phone calls from viewers. The interaction between Sharky, Haffner and the viewers helped to build a regular audience who watched and called the program every week. The viewer phone calls also gave the program even more material to use in each episode. Therefore, Sharky and Haffner could produce entire episodes based solely on using viewer phonecalls to fill the program's 30 minutes.

Although the official name of the program was still ″The Lone Shark″, Sharky and Haffner often referred to the program as ″Lone Shark Live″. This name was a conjunction of the phrase ”The Lone Shark – Live”, which Sharky and Haffner would quickly rattle-off as they answered viewer phone calls or whenever they spoke about the program during the broadcast of a live episode. Because the WFAC-TV broadcast facilities had no broadcast delay, the program aired totally uncensored. Except for rare occasions when studio time could not be scheduled to coincide with The Lone Shark’s broadcast time slot, this live format was the standard program format until 2001, when this method of broadcasting the program (live and uncensored) led to the permanent suspension of The Lone Shark and its producers.

The Sharky & Sean Show – 1999

WFAC-TV regulations required producers to sign up for their broadcast time slot every 13 episodes – or every seven episodes if the program was also going to have a repeat broadcast every week. The producers would request a primary time slot (when they wanted their original episode to broadcast) and a secondary time slot (when the repeat of the episode would be broadcast). When the producers requested a broadcast time slot, they would also enter a request for studio time. Although many programs were 30 to 60 minutes in broadcast length, the studio time was allocated in three-hour blocks, to allow for the set-up and breakdown of the studio equipment and sets for each program.

Initially, WFAC-TV did their best to accommodate the producers and keep all of the programs in the same time slots, but as new producers created more programs, the station management eventually initiated a "first come, first served” policy for broadcast time slots. This new policy caused producers to jockey for the most-wanted time slots. WFAC-TV would sometimes notify producers when it was necessary to renew their time slot requests in order to stay in the same broadcast day and time, though it was mainly the responsibility of each producer to keep track of their own time slot requests. Most of the producers of established programs would tend to respect each other's time slots, but the new producers would tend to consider the station's broadcast schedule as a "free-for-all”. Many times these new producers would produce five or six episodes of their programs and then stop production when they realized that they could not develop enough show content to continue producing the program.

The situation was the same when it came to scheduling studio time. Most of the established production crews worked on multiple programs. These established crews were efficient in preparing a studio for production and they could also break-down the studio equipment and sets very quickly. The efficiency of these established programs and their crews allowed their producers to allocate unused portions of their studio time to fellow producers. Often, the producers and crews of some of the new programs would use the entire three hours of their scheduled studio time and still not have completed recording all of the segments for their 30 or 60-minute program, so the more established producers would allow the new producers to use some of their studio time to finish their programs.

By mid-1999, The Lone Shark had been in the 9 p.m. Monday time slot for well over a year. Before Jim Sharky and Sean Haffner requested that time slot, many producers at WFAC-TV considered it to be one of the worst time slots on the station's programming schedule. Over the course of each year, any programs which broadcast in the 9 p.m. Monday time slot would be competing with Monday Night Football, Monday Night Baseball and Roseanne (when it was number 1 in the Nielsen ratings), just to name a few programs. It was the general consensus at WFAC-TV that only a very few viewers would ignore the ratings juggernauts on network television to watch a local talk show (or any other program, for that matter). Sharky and Haffner preferred the 9 p.m. Monday time slot, because it meant that they could produce The Lone Shark on a night when they would not usually have any personal obligations to attend to. That left the rest of the week open for their social lives, unlike time slots later in the week in which the program had been previously scheduled. This also meant that all preparation for The Lone Shark (what little there was) could be done during the weekend immediately preceding the Monday night broadcast.

After only a few weeks in the 9 p.m. Monday time slot, The Lone Shark was receiving just as many—if not more—phone calls as the program had received in its other time slots. The Lone Shark was also being written about in local newspapers, as well as being mentioned on-air by local radio personalities. What had—at first—seemed to be a bad time slot to the new producers now seemed to be one of the WFAC-TV program schedule's best time slots. The new producers did not take into account that by this time, The Lone Shark was one of the longer-running programs on WFAC-TV, having produced episodes for more than five years. They also did not consider that fans of the program were very loyal and would forgo watching other programs to instead watch The Lone Shark. The new producers believed that the 9 p.m. Monday time slot was the reason for the program's popularity – and they wanted the time slot for their own programs.

Having been in charge of The Lone Shark’s paperwork for more than five years (including the booking of studio and air time slots), producer Sean Haffner always made sure to immediately renew the program's time slots before any other producers could book them and thereby disrupt The Lone Shark’s production and broadcast schedules. Due to Haffner's attentiveness to these duties, the new producers could not book the 9 p.m. Monday time slot that they wanted and which The Lone Shark occupied. When the new producers complained to the WFAC-TV station management that they could not schedule their programs for the time slots that they wanted, the station management (which had been in conflict with Sharky and Haffner on numerous occasions over the previous years) suddenly changed its program scheduling policy.

Instead of being able to schedule studio and broadcast times for a period of 13 episodes, programs would now only be allowed to schedule seven episodes at a time. Producers would not be allowed to renew their scheduled broadcast time slots until all seven episodes of their program had been broadcast. These changes in policy gave the new producers a window of opportunity in which they could try to schedule their programs in The Lone Shark’s 9 p.m. Monday time slot.

Sharky and Haffner's solution was to create a new program. This new program would be broadcast on alternating weeks, with The Lone Shark filling in the broadcast dates when the new program was not scheduled to broadcast. When one program finished broadcasting its scheduled seven episodes, the alternate program would still break up the schedule for any producers hoping to schedule their program in the time slot. The new producers wanted to have their programs broadcast on consecutive weeks, so Sharky and Haffner's alternate-week scheduling of both of their programs not only allowed them to now schedule 14 weeks of episodes (instead of the original 13 weeks), it also made the intermittent unscheduled 9 p.m. Monday time slots unattractive to the other producers.

The WFAC-TV station management notified The Lone Shark’s producers that they could not produce The Lone Shark, then just give it a different name and call it a new program.  The station management assumed that Sharky and Haffner were a “one-trick pony” who would not be able to produce a program which had a different format from The Lone Shark. The station management believed that this stipulation would prevent Sharky and Haffner from producing their “new program”. However, Executive Producer Jim Sharky figured out how to create a new program that would be familiar enough to The Lone Shark’s viewers so as not  to alienate them, while being different enough in format from The Lone Shark so as to appease WFAC-TV's station management.

The new program, called The Sharky & Sean Show, was in reality just another version of The Lone Shark. On this new live program, Jim Sharky was still the host and sat in the same chair taking phone calls. The only noticeable differences from The Lone Shark were that Sean Haffner was now in front of the cameras, and while Sharky took phone calls from viewers, Haffner communicated with multiple viewers in an America Online chat room which he had created specifically for The Sharky & Sean Show. The chat room component of the program allowed many viewers to add their input to the program at once – compared to the callers, who could only be spoken with one-at-a-time.

The other difference between The Lone Shark and The Sharky & Sean Show was the new program's opening credits. Dave Warner had moved to New York State and therefore could not create credits for the new program. Instead, Sharky and Haffner opted to create the new credits themselves. Using PowerPoint, they designed the different pages for each credit and then printed the pages onto sheets of paper. These pages were then videotaped in the WFAC-TV studio, creating the new opening and closing credits for The Sharky & Sean Show.

The Sharky & Sean Show was broadcast for only 14 episodes. Sharky and Haffner's “alternating programs” schedule defeated WFAC-TV's attempt to allow the new producers to take the 9 p.m. Monday time slot, so the station management quickly rescinded the new scheduling policy. When they were once again allowed to schedule The Lone Shark for 13 consecutive weeks in the same time slot, Sharky and Haffner no longer had any use for The Sharky & Sean Show and production of the program ended.

WFAC-TV (River Street Studios) — 1995-2000

In 1995, Cablevision was receiving complaints from the administration of Fairfield University regarding the content of some of the programs being produced at the Xavier Hall facilities. The administration believed that the adult language and themes featured on The Lone Shark and a few other programs might give the university a bad public image, because most of the programs stated (either in conversation or in their credits) that they were produced at Fairfield University. The university administration informed Cablevision that they no longer wanted to host the studio and broadcast facilities on their campus if Cablevision could not control the content of the programming. Federal regulations forbade Cablevision from censoring the content of the programs produced in their local-cable studios.

Cablevision's solution was to remove the studio and broadcast equipment from the Fairfield University campus and build a new studio and broadcast facility with the equipment from the Xavier Hall facilities. The new facilities (located on River Street in Bridgeport, Connecticut) were built in a building which already housed Cablevision's Customer Service Call Center as well as the supply warehouse for Cablevision's service technicians. A section of the warehouse was walled-off, and the new studio and broadcast facilities were constructed in that section.

With the new facilities came new obstacles for the Producers of The Lone Shark and other programs. The Station Manager from the Fairfield University facility was replaced by one of Cablevision's vice-presidents, thus giving Cablevision's management direct control over the facility. That vice-president began attempting to make new rules and regulations governing the content of the programs produced at WFAC (usually after she had viewed – or only heard of – what she considered “offensive” material on The Lone Shark).

These new regulations became a regular occurrence at WFAC. The Lone Shark’s Producers often found themselves at-odds with Cablevision over these new regulations, because they were usually created to tone-down (or completely remove) segments on The Lone Shark. Eventually, Sharky and Haffner became adept at getting Cablevision to back away from their new regulations, or finding a way to skirt around the regulations that Cablevision would insist on enforcing. In this manner, The Lone Shark still included material and themes that the regulations forbade on WFAC, but without actually violating the written word of the regulations. This battle between The Lone Shark’s Producers and Cablevision continued for five years, until control of the studio and broadcast facilities was awarded to the SoundView group.

SoundView Television Studios — 2000-2001

From the time that Cablevision of Southern Connecticut first created their local-cable television production facilities in the 1980s, the corporation had total control over the facilities. Cablevision leased properties for the production and broadcast facilities, at first on the campus of the University of Bridgeport and later on the campus of Fairfield University. Cablevision also hired the facilities’ management staff, owned all of the equipment in the studios and broadcast facilities and wrote all of the rules and regulations governing program content. During the late-1990s, Cablevision began ignoring requests to repair the equipment at WFAC, instead diverting some of the funds designated for WFAC to Cablevision's Norwalk, Connecticut facility (which was also used to produce programming for Cablevision's News 12).

In 1999, due to concerns about Cablevision's total control over (and lack of maintenance to) the WFAC production facilities, an independent group which called themselves SoundView Television was organized. Soundview was composed of people from the local broadcast area who were involved in many different fields of expertise in broadcasting and production, including some former Producers of programs at WFAC. The group also had the assistance of The Discovery Museum in Bridgeport, Connecticut as well as AT&T and Con Edison. SoundView planned to petition the Connecticut DPUC (the state's governing body which oversees the cable television companies) and wrest control of the local-cable television facilities from Cablevision.

The SoundView group was concerned that, if Cablevision learned of their plans to petition the DPUC, then Cablevision would attempt to repair and revamp the WFAC facilities, to win favor from the DPUC. This would have hindered or halted the petition process, as the DPUC would be more likely to rule in favor of the group which already had an operational facility (Cablevision) over the group which only had plans to build a new facility (SoundView). Because of these concerns, the SoundView group began meeting in secret to discuss their plans for the petition, as well as plans for the new studio and broadcast facilities. The Lone Shark’s Producer, Sean Haffner, was asked to sit in on some of the group's meetings and provide ideas and input from the point of view of an active Producer. After a few months of meetings, SoundView filed their petition with the DPUC, and after a few more months of DPUC hearings, the SoundView group was awarded control of the production and broadcast facilities.

SoundView built their new facilities in the newly revitalized McClevy Green area in downtown Bridgeport, Connecticut, and in July 2000, SoundView Television Studios opened. The Grand Opening ceremony was attended by over 350 people, including local and state government officials, along with the members of local news media and the general public. The ceremony was also broadcast live on the three television stations that the SoundView Television facilities would serve in Cablevision's broadcast area. During the Grand Opening ceremony, statements were made by Bridgeport Mayor Joseph Ganim, Connecticut Governor John G. Rowland’s representative, as well as representatives from The Discovery Museum, AT&T and Con Edison. Sean Haffner also made a statement to the audience and viewers, speaking on behalf of all of the Producers who would be using the new studio and broadcast facilities.

Trouble At Soundview Television

Sharky and Haffner’s initial relationship with the Station Manager had been excellent (as demonstrated when he asked Haffner to speak at the SoundView Grand Opening ceremony). Just minutes before the very first episode of The Lone Shark began broadcasting from the new SoundView studio, the Station Manager entered the studio and personally cleaned the top of Jim Sharky’s desk, in preparation for the evening’s broadcast. He would also regularly watch the production of The Lone Shark from inside the studio’s control room. However by July 2001, as the anniversary of the first year of broadcasting from SoundView Television passed, Sharky and Haffner had begun butting heads with the Station Manager of the year-old SoundView Television Studios.

The Station Manager began making phone calls to Haffner, saying that he ”… wanted to express (his) concern” over the strong language, adult themes and content of The Lone Shark. Haffner’s response was to confront the Station Manager and question whether he was attempting to influence or censor the content of the program (something which was not allowed by the Federal regulations governing local-cable television stations). The Station Manager denied that was the motive for his phone calls. Haffner told the Station Manager that he understood his concerns, but that he and Sharky would not make any attempts to change the content of The Lone Shark. Haffner was informed that programs containing adult content and themes were supposed to broadcast after 11 p.m., but SoundView’s studio facilities closed down at 10 p.m., making it impossible to broadcast a live program after that hour (The Lone Shark broadcast live from 9-9:30 p.m. EST). Haffner rebutted that changing The Lone Shark's broadcast time slot to 11 p.m. or later would mean the program would no longer be live and therefore the interactive viewer phone calls would not be possible. Also, the SoundView Television station management could not affect the program’s content, so he questioned the Station Manager’s motives. Haffner asked the Station Manager why these recent phone calls were even being made to him, as they were unnecessary and would not result in any changes to the content of The Lone Shark. The Station Manager’s only response was to reiterate to Haffner that he was ”… only expressing (his) concern”, so Haffner decided to end the phone call. Haffner relayed the Station Manager’s concerns to Sharky, but both Sharky and Haffner considered the phone calls nothing more than the Station Manager attempting to tamper with the production of The Lone Shark.

Permanent Suspension Of Production (Cancellation)

Tensions between SoundView Television's station management and The Lone Shark’s producers built up, aggravated by Jim Sharky's inferences about the Station Manager's personal life during the ″Semenex Taste Test″ episode. Finally, in August 2001, during the live broadcast of ″The Morpheus Episode″,a three-second clip of an adult video portraying anal sex was shown during a demonstration of the capabilities of the Morpheus file sharing application. A week later, just a few hours before the next live episode of The Lone Shark was to be televised, Producer Sean Haffner received a phone call from the SoundView Television Station Manager informing Haffner that (in response to the airing of the adult video clip) the program was suspended from production. A few days later, Sharky and Haffner each received formal notices of suspension of production. The suspension stated that The Lone Shark would not be televised for a period of four weeks. After four weeks, the program could resume production, but only pre-taped episodes were to be televised for a period of six months. Once the six-month penalty period had ended, The Lone Shark was to resume the production of live episodes. The letters also stated that the producers could appeal the suspension. Sharky and Haffner decided not to appeal, because (coincidentally) both producers had more pressing personal issues that would have curbed production of The Lone Shark for at least the next six months, anyway.

In September 2001, after the initial four-week production suspension period had ended, Executive Producer Jim Sharky contacted the SoundView Television Station Manager to inquire about resuming the in-studio production of The Lone Shark. Sharky was informed that, because no appeal of the suspension had been made by himself or Haffner, a little-known clause in the Producers’ Contract with SoundView allowed the Station Manager to permanently suspend the program from production.

In May 2002, Producer Sean Haffner (speaking on behalf of himself and Jim Sharky) appealed to a meeting of the local Cable Advisory Council, which he had been told could possibly aid in restoring the production of The Lone Shark. Although only two of the Council members had actually viewed a recording of the offending episode, the remaining Council members decided that they did not need to view the recording before making a judgement on Haffner's appeal. The Council voted 4-2 against recommending restoration of The Lone Shark’s production (the two council members who had viewed the recording actually voted in favor of Haffner's appeal).

When their appeal failed, Sharky and Haffner were prodded by supporters of The Lone Shark to file a lawsuit against SoundView Television demanding that the program be allowed to resume production. After mulling over the possibility of legal action, Sharky and Haffner decided that their personal lives (which, at times over the previous ten years, had suffered because of their dedication to The Lone Shark) would take precedence. They took no further actions to resume production of the program and in June 2002, production of The Lone Shark television program was permanently dismantled.

References

External links
 

American public access television shows
Local talk shows in the United States
1991 American television series debuts
2001 American television series endings
1990s American television series
2000s American television series
Mass media in Bridgeport, Connecticut
Culture of Bridgeport, Connecticut